Kungala is a locality south of Grafton in northern New South Wales, Australia. The North Coast railway passes through, and a railway station and sidings were provided from 1915 to 1974. At the 2006 census, Kungala had a population of 205 people. The town's name is derived from an aboriginal term meaning "to shout and listen".

References

Towns in New South Wales
Northern Rivers
North Coast railway line, New South Wales
Clarence Valley Council